[PIAS] UK Distribution is the distribution arm of the [PIAS] Entertainment Group and is the United Kingdom's largest independent sales, marketing and distribution company. Founded in March 1994 as Vital Distribution, Ltd., and renamed in January 2008, [PIAS] UK represents over 100 record labels from around the world. With offices in London and Dublin, Ireland, [PIAS] UK has played a significant role in the European and worldwide successes of some of the most well-known independent artists, including Oasis, The White Stripes, The Strokes, Moby, and others.

To aid in the distribution and management of various smaller labels, [PIAS] UK created two distinct units. Established in 2004 as Vital-PIAS Digital, the [PIAS] Digital unit manages over 200 labels from the U.K. through widespread digital distribution. In 2006, [PIAS] UK developed and launched Integral, a label development company that provides the marketing structure and backing for smaller labels and rights holders to introduce, establish and promote acts on their own.

Labels 
 INVADA Records
 Beggars Group/XL Recordings
 Big Brother Recordings
 Brownswood Recordings
 Defected Records
 Domino Records
 Ninja Tune Records
 Wall of Sound
 Warp Records

References 

British record labels
Record label distributors
Record labels established in 1993